Leeroy Takunda Maguraushe (born 11 January 1996) is a Zimbabwean-born-English footballer who plays as a midfielder, most recently for San Antonio FC in the USL Championship.

References

External links
Profile at UNC Greensboro Athletics

1996 births
Living people
Luton Town F.C. players
UNC Greensboro Spartans men's soccer players
Seattle Sounders FC U-23 players
San Antonio FC players
USL Championship players
USL League Two players
Zimbabwean footballers
Zimbabwean expatriate footballers
Association football midfielders
Sportspeople from Bulawayo